Feоdosiy Tetyanich known also as Theodor Frypulia, Theodor the Infinite, Fedir Frypulia the Cossack of Kyiv, uncle Teddy or even Teddy Frypulia(man)/Frypulmann (17 February 1942, village Kniazhychi, Kyiv's region, territories of Soviet Ukraine annexed by the Third Reich - 18 February 2007, Kyiv, Ukraine) is famous Kyiv and Ukrainian artist of contemporary, post-Soviet era, painter, performance artist and philosopher upbreaded in schools of Kyiv Academy of his (late Soviet) epoch, patriot of Ukraine as nation and state and at the same time broad-minded humanist, social democrate and "citizen of the world", representative of Ukrainian underground, participant of the Ukrainian New Wave. Some of his art works are in the National Art Museum of Ukraine and private collectioins. Some people even regard him as one of the saints of Kyiv, Holy Rus (regarded as Trinityland) and Ukraine as its most old and important part, holy people, who are the core of Church, people close to God, Unperceivable Deity, Creator, Lord and Painter of Whole, Infinite Universe of specific, rare type. Among his spheres of interest as philosopher - art, history and development of civilization, ecology, globalization of Ukraine and philosophy of Infinity. Sometimes he is also regarded in connection with culture, literature, poetry, folklore, tourism, museum sphere etc.

Biography 

Feodosiy Tetyanich was born 17 February 1942 in Kniazhychi, Kyiv's region, Soviet Ukraine.

His parents were Ukrainian peasants of Orthodox Christian Ukrainian (i.e. Rusyn and Cossack at the same time) origin, who worked at a collective farm.

He studied at village school than moved to Kyiv to study in Academy of Arts. After finishing the academy he begin to work in the field of art at the same time providing further education for himself with the help of God (self-education). At that time he interested himself in the whole Universe around - religion, philosophy, art, history, culture, travelling, people, mathematics, physics, politics, communism and nationalism etc. etc. He made a lot of works of art in different styles and techniques among them social realism, historical paintings, modern art (avant-garde), etc.

From the middle of 1980s he moved to streets of Kyiv and begin share his philosophy, experience, opinion and worldview with all people around, all who wanted to engage in dialogue with him. Many Kyiv citizens and guests were impressed by him, his worldview, his style of life and artistic activity, his preaching about the beauty and bounty of Infinity and its Creator, Freepulia,  Artist of Universe, from the banks of river Dnieper.

The main theme of Feodosiy's performances was freedom (he nicknamed himself "Freepulia"), and was one of the first performance artist in post-Soviet Ukraine.

Feodosiy had married Ganna from the Bublyk family and they gave birth to their children, Bohdan and Lada.

Feodosii Tetyanych died of cancer at a hospital in Kyiv on February 18, 2007, leaving his wife and two children.Buried in the Knyazhychi village.

Miracle work of artist Tetyanich is interesting for modern art, in investigations of art-critics in 2021.

References

Sources 
 Film by O.Dirdovsky about Tetianych
 
 
 Alexandra Vagner. "Everyone saw what he wanted." Miracle work of Fedor Tetyanich. Radio Svoboda 13.03.2021

Ukrainian artists
1942 births
2007 deaths